Kim Sam-rak (김삼락; born 19 June 1940) is a South Korean former footballer who competed in the 1964 Summer Olympics.

He was manager of South Korea national under-16 football team at 1987 FIFA U-16 World Championship and South Korea national under-23 football team at 1992 Summer Olympics.

References

External links
 

 

1940 births
Living people
South Korean footballers
Olympic footballers of South Korea
Footballers at the 1964 Summer Olympics
Yonsei University alumni
Footballers from Seoul
Association football midfielders
South Korean football managers